Aquibacter is a genus from the family of Flavobacteriaceae, with one known species (Aquibacter zeaxanthinifaciens).

References

Further reading 
 

Flavobacteria
Monotypic bacteria genera
Bacteria genera